Xenagama is a genus of lizards in the family Agamidae. Species of the genus are native to Ethiopia and Somalia.

Species
The following four species are recognized as being valid.
Xenagama batillifera  – beaver-tailed agama, (dwarf) turnip-tailed agama
Xenagama taylori  – dwarf shield-tailed agama, shield-tailed agama, Taylor's strange agama, turnip-tailed agama
Xenagama wilmsi  - Wilms's agama, shield-tail agama, turnip-tail agama
Xenagama zonura  - Ethiopian ridgeback agama

Nota bene: A binomial authority in parentheses indicates that the species was originally described in a genus other than Xenagama.

References

Further reading
Parker HW (1935). "Two new Lizards from Somaliland". Annals and Magazine of Natural History, Tenth Series 16: 525–529. (Xenagama, new subgenus, p. 525).
Wagner P, Mazuch T, Bauer AM (2013). "An extaordinary tail – integrative review of the agamid genus Xenagama". Journal of Zoological Systematics and Evolutionary Research 51 (2): 144–164.

 
Lizard genera
Taxa named by Hampton Wildman Parker